is a 2022 American religious comedy film directed by Brian Cates and written by Cates and Rene Gutteridge. The film stars Tommy Woodard, Eddie James, Leigh-Allyn Baker, and Gigi Orsillo, and follows two polar-opposite families who are forced to camp together, the fathers' struggles to hold onto their families and marriages as they compete for the coveted camp trophy. The film was released on May 13, 2022 in the United States, by Roadside Attractions. The film received mixed reviews and grossed $4 million at the box office.

Plot
Businessman Tommy Ackerman's preoccupation with his job has interfered with his relationship with his wife, Grace, and their two children, Hannah and Henry. Grace insists the family attend Camp Katokwah, a church camp, located in the Ouachita National Forest. Upon arrival, the Ackermans discover Tommy failed to complete their reservation for a cabin and they are assigned to share a yurt with the Sanders family, whose vehicle had earlier passed them aggressively en route to the camp. Eddie Sanders is an insecure, self-absorbed chiropractor who, along with his wife, Victoria, and their two children Eddie Jr. and Barb, present themselves as the perfect family. Tensions quickly rise, especially between Tommy and Eddie. The two families compete for the Camp Katokwah trophy, won by the Sanders the past two years. Meanwhile, Tommy and Grace continue to navigate through their difficulties caused by Tommy's job commitments. Their teenaged daughter, Hannah, begins seeing a boy, which concerns Grace. Henry, who randomly takes videos, records an argument between Eddie and Victoria, which Tommy later views inadvertently.

Tommy and Eddie join several other men from the camp on a hike to deepen their faith. The pair becomes separated from the group and eventually lost after Eddie's attempt to take a honeycomb results in a swarm of bees attacking both men. Searchers are unable to locate them and Henry also becomes lost when he leaves camp to find his father. The differences between Tommy and Eddie come to a head; however, they are forced to unite against a pair of failed reality television show hunters who tie them up, believing they are thieves. Henry is located to Grace's delight. Tommy and Eddie finally escape and find the trail back to camp. Tommy discovers Eddie had a compass and map and is furious when Eddie admits he got them lost intentionally in order for Victoria to appreciate him upon his return. The men return to camp, but are estranged.

During the ceremony which awards the Sanders with the camp trophy for another year, Eddie confesses his shortcomings in his marriage, and also apologizes to Tommy, giving him the trophy instead. Tommy forgives Eddie and renews his commitment to Grace that he will be a better husband.

In a post-credits scene, Slim tricks Beef out of their last hot dog.

Cast
 Tommy Woodard as Tommy Ackerman
 Eddie James as Eddie Sanders
 Leigh-Allyn Baker as Grace Ackerman
 Gigi Orsillo as Victoria Sanders
 Cece Kelly as Hannah Ackerman
 Jacob M Wade as Henry Ackerman
 Elias Kemuel as Ed Jr. Sanders
 Keslee Blalock as Barb Sanders
 Mark Christopher Lawrence as Pastor Dave
 Robert Amaya as Joel
 Heather Land as Cookie
 Myke Holmes as Slim
 Weston Vrooman as Beef
 Brandon Potter as Bramberger

Production
Filming began at Edmond, Oklahoma in June 2020.

Release
The film was released in theaters on May 13, 2022, by Roadside Attractions.

Reception
In the United States and Canada, the film earned $1.4 million from 854 theaters in its opening weekend, finishing ninth at the box office. It dropped out of the box office top ten in its second weekend with $887,555.

On the review aggregator website Rotten Tomatoes, 40% of 5 reviews are positive. Nicolas Rapold of The New York Times criticized the movie, calling it a "vanishingly mild comedy that resembles other films about parents and kids bumbling in the wilderness." Tara McNamara, writing for Common Sense Media, was more positive and said, "The Skit Guys have answered faith-based movie lovers' prayers: This is easily the best Christian comedy made to date. With excellent production values, solid direction, and fantastic comedy chops from the cast, Family Camp is a winner."

References

External links
 

2022 comedy films
American comedy films
Films about families
Roadside Attractions films
2020s English-language films
2020s American films